George Trewick (15 November 1933 – 2003) was an English footballer who played as a wing half.

Trewick played in the Football League for Gateshead, making 112 appearances in league and cup between 1956 and 1960, after playing for non-league side West Sleekburn.

Sources

1933 births
2003 deaths
People from Stakeford
Footballers from Northumberland
English footballers
Association football wing halves
West Sleekburn Welfare F.C. players
Gateshead F.C. players
English Football League players